The 2021–22 Georgia Southern Eagles men's basketball team represented Georgia Southern University in the 2021–22 NCAA Division I men's basketball season. The Eagles, led by second-year head coach Brian Burg, played their home games at Hanner Fieldhouse in Statesboro, Georgia as members of the Sun Belt Conference.

Previous season
The Eagles finished the 2020–21 season 13–13, 7–9 in Sun Belt play to finish in fifth place in the East Division. They were defeated by Arkansas State in the first round of the Sun Belt tournament.

Offseason

Departures

Transfers

Recruiting

Roster

Schedule and results

|-
!colspan=12 style=| Non-conference regular season

|-
!colspan=9 style=| Sun Belt Conference regular season

|-
!colspan=12 style=| Sun Belt tournament

|-

Source

References

Georgia Southern Eagles men's basketball seasons
Georgia Southern Eagles
Georgia Southern Eagles men's basketball
Georgia Southern Eagles men's basketball